Beth Williams may refer to:

 Beth Williams (model) (born 1987), model and Playboy Playmate
 Beth Ann Williams (born 1979), American lawyer
 Beth S. Williams (1951–2004), American wildlife veterinarian
 Beth Williams (EastEnders)